The 2020–21 Dutch Basketball League (DBL) was the 61st season of the Dutch Basketball League, the highest professional basketball league in the Netherlands. The season started on 3 October 2020 and ended on 27 May 2021.

It was the first season after the 2019–20 season was ended prematurely due to the COVID-19 pandemic. The league expanded to 12 teams with the addition of Yoast United, Almere Sailors and The Hague Royals. This marked the highest number of teams since the 2007–08 season. ZZ Leiden won its fourth national title after defeating Heroes Den Bosch in the Finals.

On 15 October 2020, the season was suspended for at least four weeks due to government regulations regarding the pandemic. On 19 December 2020, it was announced the competition would restart in January 2021 with a new format.

Teams 
After falling sponsorship revenue due to the COVID-19 pandemic, the DBL lowered the minimum budget for teams from 300,000 € to 150,000 €.

On 1 May 2020, Apollo Amsterdam announced it will not play in the DBL season because of uncertainty due to the pandemic. The DBL announced the remaining eight teams will return for the 2020–21 season. On 5 August, it was announced Basketball Community Gelderland has obtained a licence. On 20 August, it was announced Apollo Amsterdam has obtained a license. On 27 August, the DBL announced the entrance of The Hague Royals and Almere Sailors. BC Gelderland later revealed Yoast United as their new club name.

Stadiums and locations 

Note: Table lists in alphabetical order.

Sponsored club names
As is common practice in European basketball, the following clubs carried the name of their sponsor this season:

Personnel and kits

Managerial changes

Regular season

Table

Results

Elite A

Table and Results
Teams carry the results from the regular season with them and play each other twice. All six teams are already qualified for the play-offs.

Elite B

Table and Results
Teams carry the results from the regular season with them and play each other twice. The two highest ranked teams qualify for the playoffs as seventh and eight seed.

Playoffs
The format of the playoffs was changed due to the compressed schedule. Quarterfinals were played as two-legged series, the semifinals as a best-of-three series and the finals as a best-of-five series.

Bracket

Quarterfinals
The quarterfinals were played in a two-legged format and were played on 8 May and 11 May 2021.

|}

Semifinals
The semifinals were played in a best of three series and were played on 15 May, 18 May and 20 May.

|}

Finals
ZZ Leiden reached the finals for the first time since 3 years, Heroes Den Bosch for the first time since 6 years. It is the sixth time the teams met each other in the finals, the last time being in 2012.

|}

Statistics

Individual statistic leaders

Individual game highs

Final standings
BAL, winners of the DBL Cup, refused to apply for the FIBA Europe Cup.

Dutch clubs in European competitions

References

Dutch Basketball League seasons
1
Netherlands
Basketball events postponed due to the COVID-19 pandemic